Greatheart is a romance novel by the British writer Ethel M. Dell which was first published in 1912. It was one of four of Dell's novels to make the Publishers Weekly list of top ten bestselling books during the 1910s in America.

Adaptation

In 1921 the novel was adapted into a silent film Greatheart directed by George Ridgwell and starring Cecil Humphreys and Madge Stuart.

References

Bibliography
 Barnett, Vincent L. & Weedon, Alexis. Elinor Glyn as Novelist, Moviemaker, Glamour Icon and Businesswoman. Routledge, 2016.
 Vinson, James. Twentieth-Century Romance and Gothic Writers. Macmillan, 1982.

1918 British novels
British novels adapted into films
British romance novels
Novels by Ethel M. Dell